Jouanneau is a surname. Notable people with the surname include:

 Daniel Jouanneau (born 1946), French diplomat and statesman
 Jacques Jouanneau (1926–2011), French actor
 Paul Jouanneau (born 1959), Brazilian freestyle swimmer

See also
 Juneau (surname)